A list of comedy films released in the 2000s.

2000

2001

2002

2003

2004

2005

2006

2007

2008
27 Dresses
The Accidental Husband
Angus, Thongs and Perfect Snogging
Another Cinderella Story
Assassination of a High School President
Asterix at the Olympic Games
Baby Mama
Be Kind Rewind
Bedtime Stories
Beverly Hills Chihuahua
Bolt
Burn After Reading
Camp Rock
CJ7
College
College Road Trip
Deal
Definitely, Maybe
Disaster Movie
Drillbit Taylor
Finding Amanda
First Sunday
Fly Me to the Moon
Fluke
Fool's Gold
Forgetting Sarah Marshall
Four Christmases
Get Smart
Ghost Town
Hancock
Happy-Go-Lucky
Harold & Kumar Escape from Guantanamo Bay
Henry Poole Is Here
Horton Hears a Who!
The Hottie and the Nottie
The House Bunny
How to Lose Friends and Alienate People
Igor
Immigrants
In Bruges
Jack and Jill vs. the World
Kung Fu Panda
The Love Guru
Mad Money
Madagascar: Escape 2 Africa
Made of Honor
Mamma Mia!
Marley & Me
Meet Dave
Meet the Spartans
Miss Pettigrew Lives for a Day
My Best Friend's Girl
My Mom's New Boyfriend
My Sassy Girl
Nick and Norah's Infinite Playlist
Nim's Island
Open Season 2
Over Her Dead Body
Paris
Picture This!
Pineapple Express
Queen Sized
The Rocker
Role Models
Run, Fatboy, Run
Semi-Pro
Sex and the City: The Movie
Sex Drive
Shred
Smart People
Snow Buddies
Space Chimps
Step Brothers
Strange Wilderness
Strictly Sexual
Superhero Movie
Tropic Thunder
Vicky Cristina Barcelona
The Wackness
WALL-E
War, Inc.
Welcome Home Roscoe Jenkins
What Happens in Vegas
What Just Happened
Wild Child
The Women
Yes Man
You Don't Mess with the Zohan
Zack and Miri Make a Porno

2009
17 Again
18-Year-Old Virgin
(500) Days of Summer
Aadhavan
Adopted
Adventureland
All About Actresses
Beeswax
The Boat That Rocked
Bride Wars
Brüno
City Rats
Confessions of a Shopaholic
De Dana Dan
 Dead Hooker in a Trunk
Endless Bummer
Evil Bong 2: King Bong
Falling Up
Funny People
Ghosts of Girlfriends Past
The Hangover
Hannah Montana: The Movie
Happy Ever Afters
He's Just Not That Into You
Ho Ho Ho
Hotel for Dogs
I Love You, Man
Ice Age: Dawn of the Dinosaurs
Julie & Julia
Last Chance Harvey
The Last Lovecraft: Relic of Cthulhu
The Maid
Main Aurr Mrs Khanna
A Midsummer Night's Party
Monsters vs. Aliens
My Year Without Sex
New in Town
Night at the Museum: Battle of the Smithsonian
Paa
Paul Blart: Mall Cop
The Pink Panther 2
Planet 51
Princess Protection Program
The Proposal
Skills Like This
Up

United Kingdom films
About a Boy (2002)
Ali G Indahouse (2002)
Anuvahood (2011)
Bend It Like Beckham (2002)
Billy Elliot (2000)
Birthday Girl (2001)
Blackball (2003)
Bridget Jones: The Edge of Reason (2004)
Bridget Jones's Diary (2001)
Calendar Girls (2003)
Chicken Run (2000)
A Cock and Bull Story (2006)
Confetti (2006)
Fishtales (2007)
Grow Your Own (2007)
Happy-Go-Lucky (2008)
Hot Fuzz (2007)
It's All Gone Pete Tong (2004)
Johnny English (2003)
Keeping Mum (2005)
Kevin & Perry Go Large (2000)
Kinky Boots (2005)
The League of Gentlemen's Apocalypse (2005)
Love Actually (2003)
Lucky Break (2001)
Magicians (2007)
Mr. Bean's Holiday (2007)
Mr. Magorium's Wonder Emporium (2007)
Mrs Henderson Presents (2005)
The Parole Officer (2001)
Relative Values (2000)
Seeing Double (2003)
Sex Lives of the Potato Men (2004)
Shaun of the Dead (2004)
Snatch (2000)
Wallace & Gromit: The Curse of the Were-Rabbit (2005)
Wimbledon (2005)

Sci-fi-comedy films
Aachi & Ssipak (2006)
The Adventures of Pluto Nash (2002)
Aqua Teen Hunger Force Colon Movie Film for Theaters
Diabolical Tales (2005)
Dude, Where's My Car? (2000)
Evolution (2001)
G.O.R.A. (2004)
The Hitchhiker's Guide to the Galaxy (2005)
Illegal Aliens (2006)
Lilo & Stitch (2002)
The Lost Skeleton of Cadavra (2001)
Man with the Screaming Brain (2005)
Men in Black II (2002)
Nutty Professor II: The Klumps (2000)
Star Wreck: In the Pirkinning (2005)
Zenon: The Zequel (2001)
Zenon: Z3 (2003)

Comedy-horror
2002
Bloody Mallory

2003
Gory Gory Hallelujah

2004
Choking Hazard
Club Dread
Dead & Breakfast
Hide and Creep
The Hollow
SARS Wars
Satan's Little Helper
Seed of Chucky
Shaun of the Dead
To Catch a Virgin Ghost
Tremors 4: The Legend Begins
Zombie Honeymoon

2005
Boy Eats Girl
Buppah Rahtree Phase 2: Rahtree Returns
Die You Zombie Bastards!
Doll Graveyard
Pervert!
Return of the Living Dead: Necropolis
Return of the Living Dead 5: Rave to the Grave

2006
Big Bad Wolf
Dead and Deader
Evil Bong
Fido
Frostbite
The Gingerdead Man
Hatchet
Not Quite Dead
Severance
Slither
Black Sheep

2007
Ghost Station
Long Pigs
Netherbeast Incorporated
Super Deluxe shorts 
Terror Toons 2: The Sick and Silly Show

2008
The Cottage
Dance of the Dead
I Sell the Dead
ThanksKilling
Tokyo Gore Police

2009
Evil Bong 2: King Bong
Jennifer's Body
The Last Lovecraft: Relic of Cthulhu
Lesbian Vampire Killers
Strigoi

Comedy-drama
Adaptation. (2002)
All About Actresses (2009)
Almost Famous (2000)
Bandits (2001)
Beeswax (2009)
Between Love and Hate (2006)
Big Fish (2003)
Billy Elliot (2000)
Bonjour Monsieur Shlomi (2003)
The Chumscrubber (2005)
City Rats (2009)
Click (2006)
Daltry Calhoun (2005)
Death at a Funeral (2007)
The Devil Wears Prada (2005)
Diary of a Mad Black Woman (2005)
Divine Secrets of the Ya-Ya Sisterhood (2002)
Duets (2000)
Dummy (2002)
The Family Stone (2005)
The Fighting Temptations (2003)
Garden State (2004)
Hanging Up (2000)
Happy Feet (2006)
Happy-Go-Lucky (2008)
Holes (2003)
Jersey Girl (2004)
The Last Supper (2003)
Lights in the Dusk (2006)
Like a Virgin (2006)
Little Miss Sunshine (2006)
Made (2001)
The Maid (2009)
Main Aurr Mrs Khanna (2009)
The Man Without a Past (2002)
Melinda and Melinda (2004)
Miracle on 1st Street (2007)
My Year Without Sex (2009)
Paa (2009)
The Royal Tenenbaums (2001)
Song Man (2009)
Stranger than Fiction (2006)
Two Weeks (2006)
Va savoir (2001)
The Weather Man (2005)

Parody films
2001: A Space Travesty (2000)
Adopted
An American Carol (2008)
Austin Powers in Goldmember (2002)
Black Dynamite (2009)
The Comebacks (2007)
Dance Flick (2009)
Date Movie (2006)
Disaster Movie (2008)
Epic Movie (2007)
Farce of the Penguins (2007)
George of the Jungle 2 (2003)
The Hebrew Hammer (2003)
Johnny English (2003)
Man of the Year (2006)
Meet the Spartans (2008)
My Big Fat Independent Movie (2005)
Not Another Teen Movie (2001)
The Onion Movie (2008)
The Producers (2005)
Scary Movie (2000)
Scary Movie 2 (2001)
Scary Movie 3 (2003)
Scary Movie 4 (2006)
Superhero Movie (2008)
Thamizh Padam (2010)
Tropic Thunder (2008)
Vampires Suck (2010)

Notes

2000s

Comedy